Desert National Park is a national park situated in the Indian state of Rajasthan, near the towns of Jaisalmer and Barmer. This is one of the largest national parks, covering an area of 3162 km². The Desert National Park is an excellent example of the ecosystem of the Thar Desert. Sand dunes form around 44% of the Park. The major landform consists of craggy rocks and compact salt lake bottoms, intermedial areas and fixed dunes. The park was gazetted in 1980.

Despite a fragile ecosystem, there is an abundance of birdlife.  The region is a haven for migratory and resident birds of the desert. Many eagles, harriers, falcons, buzzards, kestrel and vultures are spotted here. Short-toed eagles, tawny eagles, spotted eagles, laggar falcons and kestrels are the most common among these. Sand grouse are spotted near small ponds or lakes. The endangered great Indian bustard is a magnificent bird found in relatively fair numbers. It migrates locally in different seasons. The most suitable time to visit the area is between November and January. The Desert National Park has a collection of fossils of animals and plants which are 180 million years old. Some fossils of dinosaurs which are 60 million years old have been found in the area.

Geography and location
Desert National Park covers an area of 3162 km² of which 1900 km² is in Jaisalmer district and remaining 1262 km² is in Barmer district of Rajasthan State. The park was gazetted in 1980. The park mostly consists of sand dunes (44%) but also has pediments, pavements, and structural plains. Desert National Park also has fossils from the Jurassic Period.

Fauna

The Chinkara or Indian Gazelle (Gazella bennettii) is a common antelope of this region. The national park's other notable inhabitants are the desert fox, wolf and desert cat. Birdlife in this sandy habitat is vivid and spectacular. Birds such as sandgrouse, partridges, bee-eaters, larks, and shrikes are commonly seen. In the winter, the birdlife is augmented by species such as the demoiselle crane and MacQueen's bustard.
 
Perhaps the greatest attraction of the park is a bird called the great Indian bustard, a critically endangered species found only in India. Desert National Park is one of the last sites in which this species can be found in good numbers. As such, the species draws in thousands of birdwatchers from all over the world. In addition to the great Indian bustard, the park supports a variety of other birds of interest to birdwatchers and conservationists alike.

The Thar Desert, often called an 'ocean of sand', covers a large area of western Rajasthan. The fragile ecosystem of the Thar supports unique and varied wildlife. In this vast ocean of sands lies the famous Desert National Park, which provides an excellent example of the ecosystem of the Thar Desert and its diverse wildlife adventure.

The vegetation is sparse, and patches of sewan grass and aak shrub (Calotropis) can be seen. The landscape includes craggy rocks and compact salt lake bottoms, as well as intermediate areas and both fixed and shifting dunes. Around 20 percent of the vast expanse is covered with sand dunes.

Mammals: desert fox, Bengal fox, desert cat, wolf, hedgehog, chinkara.

Reptiles: spiny-tailed lizard, monitor lizard, saw-scaled viper, Russell's viper, common krait.

Avifauna: sandgrouse, Indian bustard, partridges, bee-eaters, larks and shrikes are year-round residents, while demoiselle crane and houbara bustard arrive in winter. Raptors include tawny and steppe eagles, long-legged and honey buzzards, and falcons.

Flora 
Habitats that are found in the park include open grassland, thorny bushes, and dunes. 168 plant species have been recorded in the park. Some species of trees that inhabit the park include Tecomella undulata, Moringa concanensis, Helitropium rariflorum, and Ammannie desertorum.

Attractions

Indian bustard: The endangered Indian bustard is the major attraction of Desert National Park. Brown and white in colour, the bustard is a metre tall and has long bare legs and a long neck. One can spot this tall and graceful ground-dwelling bird near the Sudashri waterhole.

Sam Sand Dunes: These dunes are located near the Thar Desert.

Gadsisar Lake: This lake is among the tourist places in Jaisalmer, Rajasthan. Thousands of migratory birds come to this place every year.

Tourism
Jeep Safari enables tourists to explore a wider area of the park in relatively short span of time.

See also
 Arid Forest Research Institute (AFRI)
 Indian Council of Forestry Research and Education

References

External links

 Desert National Park; Nomination as World Heritage Site; Nomination entry - UNESCO World Heritage Centre
 Location in Google maps
 Birding in Desert National Park

National parks in Rajasthan
Cheetah reintroduction in India
Thar Desert
Tourist attractions in Jaisalmer district
Protected areas established in 1981
1981 establishments in Rajasthan
World Heritage Tentative List for India